Academy Chicago Publishers is a trade book publisher founded in Chicago, Illinois in 1975 by Anita Miller and Jordan Miller who continue to select what is published. It was purchased by Chicago Review Press in 2014.

"... Academy Chicago Limited is a young publishing house that is winning esteem from literary folk across the country ... Anita and Jordan Miller ... publish books dear to their hearts – attractively made, mostly paperbound children's books, feminist books and new editions of hard-to-come-by literary treasures from the past." – New York Times Book Review

Current titles 
COUNTY: Life, Death and Politics at Chicago's Public Hospital by David Ansell
The Dave Store Massacre by Ron Ebest
Loves of Yulian by Julian Padowicz
Relative Strangers by Frank Cicero Jr.
A Theory of Great Men by Daniel Greenstone
Too Late for the Festival' by Rhiannon Paine

 Selected past titles
Earl Derr Biggers (Charlie Chan)
 The Black Camel Behind that Curtain The Chinese Parrot The House Without a Key Keeper of the Keys Charlie Chan Carries On Leo Bruce
 Death with Blue Ribbon Death of the Commuter Furious Old Women Such is Death Die All, Die Merrily Case for Three DetectivesJohn Cheever
 Full River and Other Uncollected StoriesArthur Conan Doyle
 The Best Horror Stories of Arthur Conan Doyle The Lost World Tales for a Winter's Night Four Classic Ghostly StoriesFrederick Engels
 The Condition of the Working Class in England Olga Lengyel
 Five Chimneys: A Woman's True Story of AuschwitzJohn Manderino
 Reason for Leaving Sam and his Brother Len Crying at Movies The Man Who Once Played Catch with Nellie Fox The H-Bomb and the JesusDavid SchmahmannNibble and KuhnEmpire SettingsIvory From Paradise Fay Weldon
 Down Among the Women The Fat Woman's Joke''

References 

Companies based in Chicago
Book publishing companies based in Illinois
Publishing companies established in 1975